The C.A. Stuck and Sons Lumber Mill is a historic industrial complex at 215 Union Street in Jonesboro, Arkansas.  It consists of four buildings: an office building, a lumber mill, and two storage sheds.  All four buildings are brick structures built c. 1890, although the office building was enlarged and given a new facade in 1905.   The Stuck mill, which was established in 1889, is one of the oldest properties associated with the early efforts to deforest Craighead County.  C.A. Stuck was an Illinois-based furniture builder who moved to Jonesboro to facilitate the production of lumber for his products.

The complex was originally listed on the National Register of Historic Places in 2002. In 2018 it was simultaneously delisted and relisted.  It was again delisted in 2019.

See also
National Register of Historic Places listings in Craighead County, Arkansas

References

Industrial buildings and structures on the National Register of Historic Places in Arkansas
Buildings designated early commercial in the National Register of Historic Places
Buildings and structures completed in 1889
Buildings and structures in Jonesboro, Arkansas
National Register of Historic Places in Craighead County, Arkansas
Former National Register of Historic Places in Arkansas